Comparini is a surname. Notable people with the surname include: 

Anne-Marie Comparini (born 1947), French politician
Fernand Comparini (1896–?), French cyclist
Giovanni Battista Comparini (died 1616), Roman Catholic prelate, Bishop of Fondi (1591–1616)